"We Go Up" is a song by rapper Nicki Minaj featuring Fivio Foreign. It was released through Young Money Entertainment and Republic Records as a single on March 25, 2022. The song was written by the artists alongside Tate Kobang, and producers Papi Yerr, Swizzy, and Szamz. It was included on Minaj's first greatest hits album, Queen Radio: Volume 1 (2022).

Background
"We Go Up" marks the first collaboration between Minaj and Foreign.

Credits and personnel
 Nicki Minaj – lead vocals, songwriting
 Fivio Foreign – featured vocals, songwriting
 Papi Yerr – production, songwriting, programming
 Swizzy – production, songwriting, programming
 Szamz – production, songwriting, programming
 Joshua Goods – songwriting
 Aubrey "Big Juice" Delaine – mixing, recording, immersive mixing, vocal engineering
 Chris Athens – mastering
 Lou Carrao – recording

Charts

References

2022 singles
2022 songs
Nicki Minaj songs
Fivio Foreign songs
Songs written by Nicki Minaj
Songs written by Fivio Foreign